This is a list of tyrants from Ancient Greece.

Abydus
Daphnis, c. 500 BC under Darius I(pro persian)
Philiscus, c. 368-360 BC (assassinated)
Iphiades, 360-? BC

Agrigentum (Acragas)
Phalaris, 570-554 BC (overthrown and roasted)
Telemachus, after 554 BC
 Alcamenes, 6th/5th century BC
 Alcandros(Alcander), 6th/5th century BC
Theron, 488-472 BC
Thrasydaeus, 472 BC (expelled and executed)
Phintias, c. 288-279 BC
Sosistratus, 279-277 BC.Later tyrant in Syracuse

Alabanda
Aridolis, 480 BC 
Amyntas, after 480 BC

Ambracia
Gorgus,son of Cypselus fl. 628-600 BC
Periander, until 580 BC,son of Gorgus and grandson of Periander of Corinth
Archinus, 6th century BC

Amastris
Amastris, until 284 BC
Eumenes, 284 until c. 270 BC (hands city over to Kingdom of Pontus)

Argos
Laphaes, 6th century BC 
Pheidon, around 550 BC
Perilaus, c. 546 BC
Archinus, c. 395 BC
Aristippus the Elder, after 272 BC
Aristomachos the Elder, before 250-240 BC (assassinated)
Aristippus, 240-235 BC (killed in action)
Aristomachus the Younger, 235-229 BC (resigned), 224-223 BC (tortured and executed)

Assos & Atarneus
Eubulus, before 351 BC
Hermias, 351-342 BC

Astacus
Evarchus, c. 430-420 BC

Athens
 Cylon, 632 BC (stoned)
 Pisistratus, 561 BC, 559-556 BC and 546-528 BC
 Hippias, 527-510 BC
 Theramenes, Critias, and Charicles leading members of the Thirty Tyrants 404-403 BC
 Lachares, 300-294 BC
 Aristion, 88-86 BC (executed)

Byzantium
Ariston, c. 513 BC ,pro persian, participated in the Scythian campaign of Darius I
Clearchus of Sparta, 411-409 BC, 404-401 BC

Cardia
 Hecataeus, fl. 323 BC

Camarina
Psaumis of Camarina, fl. c. 460 BC

Cassandreia
Apollodorus, 279-276 BC (executed)

Catane
Euarchus, 729 BC-?, founder of Catane
Deinomenes the Younger, fl. 470-465 BC
Mamercus of Catane, 345-338 BC

Chalcis(Euboea)
Tynnondas,  c. 580 BC 
Antileon, 6th century BC
Mnesarchus, before 354 BC
Callias, c. 354-350 BC, c. 343-330 BC
Taurosthenes, c. 330 BC

Chersonese
Miltiades the Elder, 555-519 BC 
Stesagoras, 519-516 BC (assassinated)
Miltiades, 516-510 BC, 496-492 BC

Chios
 Strattis, fl. 513-480 BC

Cibyra
 Moagetes, fl. 190 BC

Corcyra
 Lycophron (?), before 587 BC
 Cleonymus, 303/02 BC

Corinth
 Cypselus, 657-627 BC
 Periander, 627-587 BC
 Psammetich(Psammetichus), 587-584 BC(named after Psamtik I)
 Timophanes, 364 BC (assassinated)
 Alexander, 253-247 BC (poisoned?)
 Nicaea, 247-245 BC (married)

Cos
 Scythes, late 6th century BC
 Cadmus, resigned 494 BC
 Nicias of Cos, 1st century BC
 Nicippus, 1st century (with Nicias)

Croton
 Cylonius, c. 530 BC
 Cleinias, c. 504-495 BC
 Menedemus, until 295 BC (conquered and )

Cumae
 Aristodemus, c. 505-490 BC

Cyme
 Aristagoras, fl. 513-493 BC

Cyprus
Nicocreon, 4th century BC

Cyrene
Ophellas, 312-308 BC
Lycopus, c. 163 BC
Nicocrates, c. 51 BC (assassinated)
Leander, c. 50 BC (arrested)

Cyzicus
Aristagoras, c. 513 BC

Dardanos
 Mania, killed by her son-in-law c. 399 BC

Elatea
Mnason, 4th century BC

Elea
Demylus, 5th century BC
Nearchus, c. 430 BC

Elis
Aristotimus, 272 BC (assassinated)

Ephesus
Athenagoras, 6th century BC
Pythagoras, 6th century BC
Pindarus, around 560 BC
Aristarchus, around 545-540 BC
Pasicles, 540-530 BC, killed when returning from a feast.
Aphinagorus, fl. 530 BC
Comas, fl. 530 BC
Phanes
Melancomas, around 500 BC
Hegesias, 4th century BC
Syrpax, until 334 BC (stoned)
Melancomas II, fl. 214 BC

Epidaurus
Procles, 640 BC

Eretria
Themison, fl. 366 BC
Plutarch, c. 355-350 BC (expelled)
Hipparchus, c. 345 BC
Automedon, c. 345 BC
Cleitarchus, 345-341 BC (expelled)

Gela
Cleander, 505-498 BC (assassinated)
Hippocrates, 498-491 BC
Gelon, 491-485 BC
Hieron I, 485-466 BC
Polyzalus, fl. c. 476 BC

Halicarnassus
Artemisia I of Caria, fl. 480 BC
Lygdamis II of Halicarnassus, fl. 469-444 BC

Heraclea Pontica
Clearchus, 365-353 BC (assassinated)
Satyrus, 353-? BC
Timotheus, 352-337 BC
Dionysius, 337-305 BC
Amastris, 305-284 BC (drowned by her sons)
Oxyathres, 305-284 BC
Clearchus, 305-284 BC

Hermione
Xenon, stepped down 229 BC

Himera
Terillus, early 5th century BC

Keryneia
Iseas, 275 BC (resigned)

Lampsacus
Hippoclus, c. 513 BC
Aeantides, fl. 515-510 BC
Astyanax, before 360 BC, assasinated

Larissa
Medius, fl. 395 BC

Leontini
Panaetius, c. 615/609 BC
Aenesidemus, 498-491 BC
Hicetas, c. 347-338 BC
Heracleides, fl. 278 BC

Lindos
Cleobulus, 6th century BC

Locri
 Dionysius the Younger, 356-346 BC

Megalopolis
Aristodemus the Good, c. 262-252 BC (assassinated by the "philosopher tyrannicides" Ecdemus and Damophanes)
Lydiadas, c. 245-235 BC (joined the Achaean League)

Megara
Theagenes, c. 620-600 BC

Messana
Scythes, c. 494 BC
Cadmus, c. 494-490 BC
Anaxilas, c. 490-476 BC
Micythus, c. 476-467 BC (retired)
Leophron, c. 467-461 BC (popular revolt)
Hippon, c. 338 BC
Cios the Mamertine, c. 269 BC

Messene
Phyliades, before 336 BC (?)

Methymnae
Aristonicus, before 332 BC (tortured and executed)

Miletus
 Amphitres, late 8th or 7th century BC
 Thrasybulus, 7th century BC
 Thoas, 6th century BC
 Damasanor, 6th century BC
 Histiaeus, 518-514 BC
 Aristagoras, c. 513-499 BC (reintroduced democracy)
 Timarchus, 3rd century BC

Mytilene
Melandrus, late 7th century BC
Myrsilus, late 7th century BC, (Alcaeus was against him)
Pittacus, fl. 600 BC (resigned after ten years)
Coes, c. 507-499 BC (stoned)

Naxos
Lygdamis, until c. 512 BC
Aristagoras, c. 502-499 BC

Orchomenus
Aristomelidas, Archaic period (?)
Nearchus, 234 BC (resigned)

Oreus
Philistides, c. 341 BC (expelled)
Menippus, c. 341 BC (expelled)

Parium
Herophantus, c. 513 BC

Pellene
Chaeron, after 336 BC

Pharsalus
Sisyphus, fl. 395 BC
Polydamas, until 370 BC

Pherae
Lycophron
Jason, before 370 BC (assassinated)
Polydorus, before 370 BC (assassinated)
Polyphron, 370-369 BC (assassinated)
Alexander, 369-358 BC (assassinated)
Tisiphonus, 357-355/4 BC
Lykophron II, 355-352 BC (resigned)
Peitholaus, 355-352 BC (resigned)

Phlius
Leo, c. 540 BC
Cleonymus, before 229 BC (resigned)

Phocaea
Laodamas, c. 513 BC

Phocis
Aulis, fl. c. 520 BC
Phayllus, fl. 352 BC

Pisa
Damophon, before 7th century BC (?)
Pantaleon, fl. 660-644 BC
Damophon, fl. 588 BC
Pyrrhus, 6th century BC

Priene
Hieron of Priene, 300-297 BC

Proconnesus
Metrodorus, c. 513 BC

Rhegium
Anaxilas, 494-476 BC
Micythus, c. 476-467 BC (retired)
Leophron, c. 467-461 BC (popular revolt)
Dionysius the Younger, before 352 BC (expelled)
Calippus, 352/351 BC (assassinated)
Leptines II, after 351 BC
Decius Vibellius, 280-270 BC (conquered)

Samos
 Demoteles, 7th century BC
 Syloson, c. 538 BC
 Polycrates, c. 538-522 BC
 Maiandrius, c. 522 BC (reintroduced democracy)
 Charilaus, c. 522 BC
 Syloson, again c. 521 BC
 Aeaces, around 513 BC, reinstalled after 494 BC
 Theomestor, after 480 BC
 Duris, c. 280 BC

Selinus
 Theron, 6th/5th century BC
 Pythagoras, 6th/5th century BC 
 Euryleon of Sparta, 6th/5th century BC (killed)

Sicyon
 Orthagoras, from 676 BC
 Myron the Elder, fl. 648 BC , former Olympian winning in chariot race
 Myron the Younger?
Aristonymus,father of Cleisthenes
 Isodemus
 Cleisthenes, 600-560 BC
 Aeschines, 560-556 BC removed by the Spartans
 Euphron, 368-366 BC (assassinated)
 Aristratus, fl. c. 340 BC
 Epichares (?), fl. c. 330 BC
 Cratesipolis, 314-308 BC (bribed)
 Cleon, c. 300-280 BC (assassinated)
 Euthydemus, c. 280-270 BC (expelled)
 Timocleidas, c. 280-270 BC (expelled)
 Abantidas, 264-252 BC (assassinated)
 Paseas, 252-251 BC (assassinated)
 Nicocles, 251 BC (expelled by Aratus of Sicyon)

Sigeum
 Hegesistratus, fl. 510 BC

Sinope
 Timesilaus, before 433 BC
 Scydrothemis, 301-280 BC

Sparta
 Machanidas, 210-207 BC (killed in action)
 Nabis, 207-192 BC (assassinated by allies)
 Chaeron, 180 BC

Sybaris
 Telys, c. 510 BC

Syracuse
 Gelon, 491-478 BC
 Hieron I, 478-466 BC
 Thrasybulus, 466-465 BC (expelled, democracy restored)
 Dionysius the Elder, 405-367 BC
 Dionysius II, the Younger, 367-357 BC
 Apollocrates, 357 BC
 Heracleides, 357 BC
 Dion, 357-354 BC
 Calippus, 354-352 BC
 Hipparinus, 352-351 BC
 Aretaeus, 352-350 BC
 Nysaeos, 350-346 BC
 Dionysius II, the Younger, (restored, 346-344 BC)
 Timoleon, 345-337 BC
 Agathocles, 320 BC (banished)
 Acestorides, 320-319 BC
 Agathocles, 317-289 BC 
 Hicetas, 289-279 BC
 Thoenon, 279 BC ,See Siege of Syracuse (278 BC)
 Sosistratus, 279-277 BC
 Hieron II, 275-215 BC
 Gelon II, c. 240-216 BC
 Hieronymus, 215-214 BC
 Adranodoros, 214-212 BC
 Hippocrates, 213-212 BC
 Epicydes, 213-212 BC

Tarentum
 Aristophylidas, c. 516-492 BC

Tarsus
 Lysias, before 67 BC

Tauromenium
 Andromachus, fl. 344 BC 
 Tyndarion, fl. 278 BC

Thasos
 Symmachus, c. 520 BC

Thebes
 Leontiades, 382-379 BC (killed)
 Archias, 382-379 BC (killed)

Zeleia
 Nicagoras, 334 BC (conquered by Alexander the Great)

References

 
Tyrants
Greek
Ancient tyrants